Alvin Landy (1905–1967) was an American bridge administrator and player.

Creator of the Landy convention, he was inducted into the American Contract Bridge League's Hall of Fame in 1998.

Bridge accomplishments

Honors

 ACBL Hall of Fame 1998 
 ACBL Honorary Member 1957

Awards

 von Zedtwitz Award 1998

Wins

 North American Bridge Championships (8)
 Spingold (1) 1936 
 Marcus Cup (1) 1951 
 Mitchell Board-a-Match Teams (4) 1947, 1948, 1954, 1958 
 Chicago Mixed Board-a-Match (1) 1939 
 Spingold (1) 1949

Runners-up

 North American Bridge Championships (4)
 Masters Individual (1) 1939 
 Reisinger (1) 1949 
 Spingold (2) 1946, 1952

Notes

External links
 

American contract bridge players